As Above... was an album released in 1982 by Þeyr, an Icelandic new wave and rock group. It was issued through the Shout record label on a 12" vinyl record.

Consisting of 12 tracks, As above... contained English versions of the band's hits. A song that stands out from the rest is "Killer Boogie", a work which has been considered an attempt by the group to break through on the international market.

"Killer Boogie" and "Rúdolf" are featured again in Rokk í Reykjavík (Rock in Reykjavík), a concert compilation released in 1982 with the presence of other renowned Icelandic bands. There is also a video for this compilation which was edited on VHS format only.

"Rúdolf" contains a sample of Hitler saying "Around us is Germany. In us Germany marches. And behind us Germany follows". It was a fragment taken from Triumph des Willens (Triumph of the Will), a propaganda film directed by Leni Riefenstahl in 1934. However, the record inserts credit A. Schicklgruber as the impersonator of Hitler’s voice.

The title of the album is thought to be inspired by Killing Joke's What's THIS For...! from 1981. It sarcastically refers either to the band's name or to their previous works (in the sense that "as above" is written on application forms). It is sometimes also considered to be half of the occult maxim "as above, so below," which originates in the second line of the medieval alchemical text called the Tabula Smaragdina or Emerald Tablet.

The remaining songs of this album were never reissued since the masters are believed to be lost. By 2001 Þeyr’s members and friends released a CD titled Mjötviður til Fóta which included songs from their second album, Mjötviður Mær and the single Iður til Fóta, both releases from 1981.

Track listing

Track notes
"Homo Gestalt" is another version of "Life Transmission" which appeared on Life Transmission (1981).
"Dead/Undead" is the English version of "Bás 12" which appeared in Iður til Fóta (1981).
"Wolf" is the same as "Úlfur", from Mjötviður Mær (1981).
"Technologos" is the same as "2999" from Mjötviður Mær.
"Are You Still There" is the English version of "Tedrukkinn" from Mjötviður Mær.
"Enough" is the same as "Það er Nóg" from Mjötviður Mær.
"Shout" is the English version of "Ópið" from Mjötviður Mær.

Controversy over Rúdolf

The meaning of the song "Rúdolf" was the focus of controversy among many who thought it was an allegory to Nazism. Þeyr was an anti-fascist group. Several years later, drummer Sigtryggur Baldursson said: "The song 'Rúdolf' was supposed to be a criticism, but was really interpreted as we were Nazis. We also adopted some Nazi things like clothing, but we were never real Nazis. We were just showing off, just like today."

Credits
Production: Þeyr and Tony Cook.
Music: all tracks by Þeyr.
Lyrics: Hilmar Örn Hilmarsson, with the exception of "Killer Boogie" whose lyrics were created by Þeyr.
Backing vocals: A. Schichelgruber is credited on the song "Rúdolf".
Album and sleeve design: Hilmar Örn Hilmarsson.

External links
Page about Þeyr 
Website about the history and discography of Þeyr
Tónlist.is - Page about Þeyr. It features mp3 samples (in Icelandic).
Intravenous.de - Page about Icelandic music. It includes a section for Þeyr.
Official site of Guðlaugur Kristinn Óttarsson
Page of G. K. Óttarsson at MySpace.com
Page of Þorsteinn Magnússon at MySpace.com
Official site of Sigtryggur Baldursson

1982 albums
Þeyr albums